Zhang Wenxiong (born 4 April 1962) is a former Chinese politician, and head of Publicity Department of CPC Hunan Provincial Committee. He was dismissed from his position in November 2016 for investigation by the Central Commission for Discipline Inspection.

Career
Zhang Wenxiong was born in Yueyang, Hunan on 4 April 1962, and he was entered to  Hunan Institute of Science and Technology in 1980 and graduated in 1982. Then he became the officer in Yueyang Education Bureau. From 1985 to 1994, he served in Yueyang County Party Committee.  In 1994, he transferred to Office of Hunan Party Committee until 2001. In 2006 he became the CPC Secretary of Huaihua, and transferred to Hengyang in 2011. In 2011, he was elected as Member of CPC Provincial Standing Committee of Hunan. Zhang became the head of Hunan Provincial Party Propaganda Department in August 2015.

Downfall
On November 8, 2016, Chen Shulong was placed under investigation by the Central Commission for Discipline Inspection, the party's internal disciplinary body, for "serious violations of regulations". Zhang was expelled from the Communist Party on February 27, 2017.

On August 16, 2018, Zhang was sentenced to 15 years in prison for taking bribes worth 23.35 million yuan and unidentified 51.58 million yuan property in Guilin People's Intermediate Court.

Personal life 
Zhang married Tu Aifang, a businesswoman who accompanied him from Huaihua to Hengyang and used Zhang's power to undertake projects all the way. In Zhang's hometown of Yueyang, a company without sand mining qualification in which Tu held a stake had a sand mining sales amount of nearly 1 billion yuan ($156 million) in nine months, while Tu and her partners had a total profit of more than 300 million yuan ($46.8 million).

References

1962 births
Chinese Communist Party politicians from Hunan
People's Republic of China politicians from Hunan
Political office-holders in Anhui
Hunan Normal University alumni
Central South University alumni
Living people
Politicians from Yueyang
Expelled members of the Chinese Communist Party